Gombosure Enkhtaivan is a Mongolian archer who competed at the 1976 Summer Olympic Games.

Career 

She competed in the women's individual event and finished 24th with a score of 2156 points.

References

External links
 
 Profile on worldarchery.org

Possibly living people
Date of birth missing
Mongolian female archers
Olympic archers of Mongolia
Archers at the 1976 Summer Olympics